Nolan may refer to:

People
Nolan (surname)
Nolan (given name)
 The Nolans, an Irish all-female band

Places
Canada
 Nolans Corners, Ontario
United States
 Nolan, Texas
 Nolan County, Texas
 Nolan River, in Texas
 Nolan, West Virginia

See also
 Nolan amphora
 Nolan Chart, a political diagram popularized by Libertarian David Nolan
 Nolan Helmets, an Italian helmet manufacturer
 Nolan principles, first report of the Committee on Standards in Public Life